McCartney Peak is a  mountain summit located within Olympic National Park in Jefferson County of Washington state. Part of the Olympic Mountains, McCartney Peak is situated 18 miles south of Port Angeles, and set within the Daniel J. Evans Wilderness. Precipitation runoff from the mountain drains north into headwaters of the Lillian River, east to the Gray Wolf River via Cameron Creek, and west to the Elwha River via Lost River. The nearest higher neighbor is line parent Mount Cameron,  to the southeast.

History
McCartney Peak was in the late 19th century known as "Lillian Peak," and nearby Windfall Peak was originally named McCartney Peak, for a trapper known as "Old Man McCartney" who frequented this area. Over the subsequent years, mapping errors resulted in present-day names and locations.

Climate

Based on the Köppen climate classification, McCartney Peak is located in the marine west coast climate zone of western North America. Most weather fronts originate in the Pacific Ocean, and travel east toward the Olympic Mountains. As fronts approach, they are forced upward by the peaks of the Olympic Range, causing them to drop their moisture in the form of rain or snowfall (Orographic lift). As a result, the Olympics experience high precipitation, especially during the winter months. This climate supports remnants of the Lillian Glacier on the east slope. During winter months, weather is usually cloudy, but due to high pressure systems over the Pacific Ocean that intensify during summer months, there is often little or no cloud cover during the summer. The months July through September offer the most favorable weather for viewing or climbing this mountain.

Geology

The Olympic Mountains are composed of obducted clastic wedge material and oceanic crust, primarily Eocene sandstone, turbidite, and basaltic oceanic crust. The mountains were sculpted during the Pleistocene era by erosion and glaciers advancing and retreating multiple times.

See also

 Olympic Mountains
 Geology of the Pacific Northwest

References

External links
 
 Weather forecast: McCartney Peak
 McCartney Peak: Mountain-forecast.com

Olympic Mountains
Mountains of Washington (state)
Mountains of Jefferson County, Washington
Landforms of Olympic National Park
North American 2000 m summits